The Zenobia was a merchant schooner ship launched on 21 July 1868, then under captain C. Southwood.

On 16 May 1887 the 89-ton vessel sailed from Newport, Monmouthshire carrying coal, and was lost at sea. Parts of the boat were found ashore in Llanelli on 2 June 1887.

References

Merchant ships of the United Kingdom
Individual sailing vessels
1868 ships
Maritime incidents in May 1887